ECPI University, or East Coast Polytechnic Institute, is a private, for-profit educational institution based in Virginia Beach, Virginia. It provides undergraduate- and graduate-level education in an accelerated format. ECPI University has six colleges with campuses in Virginia, North Carolina, South Carolina, Florida, and online. The university is accredited by the Southern Association of Colleges and Schools Commission on Colleges.

History 
ECPI University was founded in Norfolk, Virginia in 1966 as Electronic Computer Programming Institute. Initially formed as an institution offering accelerated education in computer science and programming, ECPI University later expanded its offerings to include electronics engineering technology, health sciences, nursing, and culinary arts.

In 2012, ECPI University was the subject of a U.S. Senate report by the Committee on Health, Education, Labor, and Pensions investigating the misuse of federal funds by for-profit education companies. The report concluded that while ECPI's student withdrawal rates at its physical campuses were significantly lower than many other for-profit universities examined, its withdrawal rates for its smaller online programs, as well as its student-loan default rates, were troubling.

ECPI University was previously known as ECPI College of Technology, but it changed its name on June 1, 2011, and began offering master's degrees in the field of computer and information science.

Colleges 
ECPI University's academic offerings are organized into six colleges: College of Technology, College of Nursing, College of Health Sciences, College of Business, College of Criminal Justice, and College of Culinary Arts.

Academics 
ECPI University offers diploma and degree programs in information technology, electronics engineering technology, health science, nursing, business, criminal justice, and culinary arts through its five colleges.

Students take two courses per session from a year-round curriculum, and the university offers 30-month bachelor's degrees and 15-month associate degrees. Courses are offered on campus, online or in hybrid formats.

Licensure and accreditation 
ECPI University has been regionally accredited by the Commission on Colleges of the Southern Association of Colleges and Schools (SACSCOC) since 1998 to award associate's, baccalaureate, and master's degrees.

The university received approval at the December 2010 SACSCOC annual meeting to advance to a Level III institution with the approval of the Master of Science in information systems program.

Additional regional and state licensure has been awarded based on location and program.

Locations 
As of 2019, ECPI University and its six colleges have 20 campus locations throughout Virginia, North Carolina, South Carolina, Florida, and Texas.

References

External links 
 Official website

 Private universities and colleges in Virginia
 Private universities and colleges in North Carolina
 Private universities and colleges in South Carolina
 For-profit universities and colleges in the United States
 Education in Virginia Beach, Virginia
 Education in Newport News, Virginia
 Education in Prince William County, Virginia
 Education in Charlotte, North Carolina
 Education in Greensboro, North Carolina
 Education in Raleigh, North Carolina
 Education in Columbia, South Carolina
 Education in Charleston, South Carolina
 Education in Greenville, South Carolina
1966 establishments in Virginia
 Education in Seminole County, Florida